Gemixystus rippingalei is a species of sea snail, a marine gastropod mollusk in the family Muricidae, the murex snails or rock snails.

Description

Distribution
This marine species occurs off Queensland, Australia.

References

 Houart R. & Héros V. (2019). The genus Gemixystus Iredale, 1929 (Gastropoda: Muricidae: Trophoninae) in New Caledonia with the description of two new species and some notes on the genus in the Indo-West Pacific. Novapex. 20(1-2): 1-12

External links
 R. (1998). Description of eight new species of Muricidae (Gastropoda). Apex. 13(3): 95-109
 Houart R. (2004). A review of Gemixystus Iredale, 1929 (Gastropoda: Muricidae) from Australia and New Zealand. Novapex. 5 (Hors-série 2): 1-27

Gastropods described in 1998
Gemixystus